The Chu-Ili Range is a range of mountains in Kazakhstan. Administratively it is part of the Almaty and Zhambyl regions.

The M36 Highway skirts the range along its northeastern flank.

Geography 
The Chu-Ili Range is ancient and heavily eroded. It is part of the Trans-Ili Alatau, a northern extension of the Tian Shan. The Chu River flows to the west of the range and to the northeast stretches the Taukum desert of the Balkhash-Alakol Basin.

Aytau is a subrange in the northern section. The Maizharylgan range stretches northwestwards from the northern end of the range and the Betpak-Dala desert to the WNW. To the south stretches the Kindyktas, a higher and more massive spur of the northwestern Trans-Ili Alatau. The Ashchysu is the main river having its sources in the range.

Flora 
Generally, the mountains of the range have a barren look. The slopes are covered with rough desert-steppe vegetation of sagebrush and fescue. Grasses, tulips, irises and poppies bloom in spring when water flows in the ravines, including Tulipa regelii, a rare species of tulip endemic to the range.

See also
Geography of Kazakhstan

References

External links

Kazakhstan tourism — Chu-Ili mountains

Mountain ranges of Kazakhstan
Mountain ranges of the Tian Shan